Ibadah ( ‘ibādah, also spelled ibada) is an Arabic word meaning service or servitude. In Islam, ibadah is usually translated as "worship", and ibadat—the plural form of ibadah—refers to Islamic jurisprudence (fiqh) of Muslim religious rituals.

Ibadah
In Arabic ibadah is connected with related words such as "Ubudiyyah" ("slavery"), and has connotations of obedience, submission, and humility. The word linguistically means "obedience with submission".

In Islam, ibadah is usually translated as "worship"  and means  obedience, submission, and devotion to God.

Other sources (noted Islamist author Abul A'la Maududi and others) give a broader definition of ibadah, including keeping speech free "from filth, falsehood, malice, abuse", and dishonesty,  obeying Islamic Shariah law in "commercial and economic affairs" and in "dealings with your parents, relatives, friends", and everyone else.

Ibadat
Ibadat is the plural form of ibādah.  In addition to meaning more than one ibādah, it refers to Islamic jurisprudence (fiqh) on "the rules governing worship in Islam" or the "religious duties of worship incumbent on all Muslims when they come of age and are of sound body and mind". It is distinguished from other subjects of jurisprudence in Islam which are usually known as muʿāmalāt (interpersonal transactions).

Ibadat include what are known as the "pillars of Islam": 
 Declaration of faith (shahadah), translated as "There is no god other than Allah. Muhammad is the messenger of Allah";
 ritual prayer (salat), observed five times every day at prescribed times, with prescribed preparations (ritual cleaning), prescribed movements (standing, bowing, prostrating, sitting) and prescribed verses, phrases;
 alms giving (zakah) -- customarily 2.5% of a Muslim's total savings and wealth above a minimum amount  known as nisab, which is based on income and the value of all of one's possessions;
 fasting (sawm) -- the abstention from eating and drinking during daylight hours—especially during the Islamic holy month of Ramadan; 
 pilgrimage to Mecca (hajj)—the annual Islamic pilgrimage to the most holy city of the Muslims, and a mandatory religious duty for Muslims that must be carried out at least once in their lifetime by all adult Muslims who are physically and financially capable of undertaking the journey, and can support their family during their absence.  
According to Oxford Islamic Studies, "because they are of central importance to the Muslim community, the ibadat form the first subject matter of Islamic jurisprudence and most collections of prophetic traditions (hadith)." The subject of ibadat is especially important in Islam (according to author Faleel Jamaldeen) because without these religious laws, "Muslims would likely create their own rituals and prayers, and the religion of Islam would falter and eventually disappear."

See also

Schools of Islamic theology

References

External links
Ibadah in Islam
The Meaning of Worship in Islam
Ibadah

Islamic practices
Arabic words and phrases in Sharia
Islamic terminology
Islamic worship
Sharia legal terminology
Islamic jurisprudence